The Emerald Express (EmX) is a bus rapid transit (BRT) system in the Eugene-Springfield metropolitan area in Oregon, United States. It is provided by the Lane Transit District (LTD) which is the public transit authority in Lane County, Oregon.

LTD chose bus rapid transit after a review process in which several transportation options, including light rail, were considered. It was decided that the BRT option was the best fit for Eugene-Springfield's size and current transportation needs.

The first route, named the Green Line, was opened in early 2007, connecting downtown Springfield to downtown Eugene. There are ten stops along the  route, including the University of Oregon.

Less than a year later, ridership had doubled in the corridor, and the city of Eugene was nominated for the 2008 Sustainable Transportation Award, and received an honorable mention.  An extension was opened on January 9, 2011, connecting EmX to the Gateway Mall as well as Sacred Heart Medical Center at RiverBend and International Way. A second extension to West Eugene opened on September 17, 2017, adding  to the system.

The Institute for Transportation and Development Policy (ITDP), under its BRT Standard, has given the EmX corridor a Bronze ranking.

Description
The EmX system is made up of sections of dedicated bus lanes for most of the route (60%), with normal roads in between.  The vehicles are given signal priority via ground-loop signaling to the traffic control system, with special traffic signals at intersections.  The vehicles have two sets of doors on the left and three on the right, allowing loading from platforms on either side. Most of the right hand side platforms can only accommodate the rear two doors.  Riding the Emerald Express was free when it began operations, but now costs regular fare.  The articulated buses are equipped with Hybrid drives which allows for a smooth acceleration from stops and through the various road segments.

On weekdays, service runs approximately from 6:00am to 11:00pm.  Buses arrive every 10 minutes throughout the day, with longer headways during the evening and the first hour of the morning.  More limited service operates during the weekend.

Fares
EmX fares are the same as other LTD bus routes; both single-ride ($1.75) and passes ($3.50 daily, $50 monthly) are accepted.

Unlike other LTD bus routes, the EmX uses a proof-of-payment system, and fares must be paid prior to boarding at ticket vending machines located on station platforms.

Lines

Green Line
The first EmX line, the Franklin Corridor (Green Line), opened on January 14, 2007. It runs between Eugene Station in downtown Eugene and Springfield Station in downtown Springfield, and serves the University of Oregon.

Compared with the non-BRT service that the Green Line replaced (Route 11), rush hour travel times decreased over 25% from 22 minutes to 16 minutes and ridership doubled in the first year. In fiscal 2008–09, Green Line ridership was 1.6M.

Local artist Linn Cook was selected by a committee of artists and community members to create cast and formed metal railings depicting indigenous plants. Each station features a different plant.

Gateway Line
The  Gateway Line extension opened on January 9, 2011, linking downtown Springfield and Sacred Heart Medical Center at RiverBend. It uses the newly constructed Pioneer Parkway corridor and newly-constructed dedicated bus lanes on Martin Luther King Jr. Parkway and RiverBend Drive.

West Eugene Extension
The West Eugene Extension added 17 stations west of Eugene Station. It opened on September 17, 2017.

LTD conducted environmental analyses and collected public comments as part of the extension's planning process. A number of route alignments were considered, focusing on West 6th, 7th, or 13th Avenues to connect with West 11th Avenue somewhere near Chambers or Garfield Streets. One alternative placed service on West 7th Place instead of West 11th Avenue between Garfield and Seneca Rd. All alternatives continued down West 11th Avenue to a planned terminus and turnaround in the Walmart parking lot west of Commerce Street. In spring 2011, the west 6th and 7th to 11th was selected as the locally preferred alternative.

Some local businesses and residents opposed the extension, saying that it would be expensive, unnecessary, and could cause a decrease in property values. In June 2013, opponents of the extension filed suit in federal court in Seattle, challenging the extension's approval and funding by the Federal Transit Administration. The suit alleged nine violations of the National Environmental Policy Act and alleged violations of the Administrative Procedure Act. The suit further claimed that LTD had not met requirements for federal funding. The court ruled against the extension's opponents in July 2014, and construction began in March 2015. The Federal Transit Administration awarded $75 million to the project in September 2015, covering most of its $96.5 million total cost.

Future

LTD eventually plans to run EmX along all main transportation corridors in the metro area. Their MovingAhead long-range plan includes expansion of EmX service on new corridors. , the corridors under consideration for EmX or other expanded bus services are 30th Avenue to serve Lane Community College; Coburg Road; Highway 99; Martin Luther King Jr. Boulevard; and River Road.

Stations

References

External links

Lane Transit District official website with description of project
Federal Transit Administration description of the project
 Bus Rapid Transit Policy Center description and evaluation of the project
 Our Money, Our Transit, website that opposes West Eugene extension.

Bus rapid transit in Oregon
Transportation in Eugene, Oregon
Springfield, Oregon
2007 establishments in Oregon